Robert-Magny is a former commune in the Haute-Marne department in north-eastern France. On 1 January 2016, it was merged into the new commune La Porte du Der. Between 1972 and 2012 it was part of the commune Robert-Magny-Laneuville-à-Rémy.

See also
Communes of the Haute-Marne department

References 

Former communes of Haute-Marne